Paul Morphy was an American chess player, considered an unofficial world champion in the late 1850s.

Morphy may also refer to:

People 
 Alonzo Morphy (1798–1856), American lawyer, Attorney General of Louisiana
 Countess Morphy (1883–1938), nom de plume of British-American author Marcelle Azra Hincks
 Donal Morphy (1900–1975), British electrical engineer
 Florence Morphy (–1944), Australian-born Countess of Darnley
 Garret Morphy (–), Irish painter
 George Morphy (1884–1946), Irish athlete
 Guillermo Morphy (1836–1899), Spanish aristocrat, musicologist and composer
 Harold Morphy (1902–1987), British rower
 Hugh Boulton Morphy (1860–1932), Canadian politician

See also 
 Morphe Cosmetics, American cosmetic retailer 
 Morphine, pain medication of the opiate family